The Shirley Foundation, based in the United Kingdom, was established in 1996 by Dame Stephanie Shirley CH, who gave a substantial endowment to establish a charitable trust fund. The foundation ranked in the top 50 of grant giving foundations in the UK and was 'spent out' in 2018.

Major awards have been given as follows: £15m has been given to the Worshipful Company of Information Technologists and the Oxford Internet Institute. Over £50m has been given for autism spectrum disorders. including setting up three charities: Autism at Kingwood founded in 1994 (support services); Prior's Court Foundation founded in 1999 (education) and Autistica founded in 2004 (research) which together employ over 1,000 staff. The foundation also founded Autism Cymru charity (1999-2011); the All-Party Parliamentary Group on Autism (1999); the National Autism Project (2014-2019); the National Autistic Taskforce (2017-); and supported the Patrick Wild Centre; Autism Together; The Autism Research Centre and many others (70 autism projects in total).

References

External links
 Steve Shirley Foundation

1996 establishments in the United Kingdom
Organizations established in 1996
Foundations based in the United Kingdom
Medical and health foundations
Autism-related organisations in the United Kingdom